The list of Olympic men's ice hockey players for the Czech Republic consisted of 103 skaters and 9 goaltenders. Men's ice hockey tournaments have been staged at the Olympic Games since 1920 (it was introduced at the 1920 Summer Olympics, and was permanently added to the Winter Olympic Games in 1924). The Czech Republic has participated in seven tournaments, the first in 1994 and most recently in 2018, though from 1920 until 1992 they participated as part of Czechoslovakia. The Czech Republic has won two medals: a gold in 1998 and a bronze in 2006. 

Jaromír Jágr has played in the most Olympic tournaments, 5, and also played in the most games, with 28. Jágr has scored the most goals, 9, assists, 14, and points, 23. Seven players — Dominik Hašek, Milan Hejduk, Jágr, Robert Lang. Martin Ručinský, Jaroslav Špaček and Martin Straka — were on both of the Czech Republic's medal-winning teams. Hašek has been inducted into both the Hockey Hall of Fame and International Ice Hockey Hall of Fame, the only player from the Czech Republic in either.



Key

Goaltenders

Skaters

Notes

References

 
 
 
 
 
 

Ice hockey Olympics
Czech Republic
Czech Republic